is a railway station on the Tadami Line in the city of Aizuwakamatsu, Fukushima Prefecture, Japan, operated by East Japan Railway Company (JR East). Nanukamachi is "七日町" in Japanese. It means that bazaar was held on the seventh day in Edo era. "七日町" is also called "Nanokamachi".

Lines
Nanukamachi Station is served by the Tadami Line and is located 1.3 rail kilometres from the official starting point of the line at Aizu-Wakamatsu Station.

Station layout
Nanukamachi Station has one side platform serving a single bi-directional track. The station is unattended; however, within the station building is the "EkiCafe", a shop that sells many things of Aizu region, such as traditional sweets. And it also has an information corner about sightseeing in Aizu. The bus for sightseeing of Aizuwakamatsu stops at Nanukamachi station, It's called "Haikara-san".

History
Operations were suspended from June 20, 1945, to June 20, 1946. The station was absorbed into the JR East network upon the privatization of the JNR on April 1, 1987. A new station building was completed July 28, 2002.

Surrounding area
 Amida Temple
 Aizuwakamatsu city hall
 Aizuwakamatsu post office
 Wakamatsu-Nanukamachi post office
 Nisshin Elementary School
 Aoi Senior High School
 Aizuwakamatsu Xaverio Gakuen 
 Elementary School
 Junior High School
 Senior High School

 Fukushima Prefectural Route 59
 Fukushima Prefectural Route 325
 Fukushima Prefectural Route 326

See also
 List of railway stations in Japan

References

External links

 JR East Station information 
 Aizu Railway Station information 
 Nanukamachi Street information 

Railway stations in Fukushima Prefecture
Tadami Line
Aizu Line
Railway stations in Japan opened in 1934
Aizuwakamatsu